Anthony Giacchino (born 1969) is an Academy Award winning American documentary filmmaker and is also director and composer Michael Giacchino's brother.

Giacchino wrote and directed the 2007 documentary film The Camden 28 which was nominated for the Writers Guild of America Award for Best Documentary Screenplay. In 2020 he directed the documentary film Colette, co-produced by Oculus and Respawn Entertainment as part of the documentary gallery for the virtual-reality video game Medal of Honor: Above and Beyond. Colette won the Academy Award for Best Documentary Short Subject at the 93rd Academy Awards.

He is the younger brother to film composer Michael Giacchino and grew up in Edgewater Park, New Jersey, attended Holy Cross High School and is a graduate of Villanova University. He has resided in Astoria, Queens.

References

External links
 

Living people
1969 births
Directors of Best Documentary Short Subject Academy Award winners
Holy Cross Academy (New Jersey) alumni
People from Edgewater Park, New Jersey
People from Astoria, Queens
American filmmakers
American people of Italian descent
Villanova University alumni